"Look What Followed Me Home" is a song co-written and recorded by American country music artist David Ball.  It was released in January 1995 as the third single from the album Thinkin' Problem.  The song reached number 11 on the Billboard Hot Country Singles & Tracks chart.

The song's B-side, "What Do You Want with His Love", was the album's fourth single, released in May 1995. "What Do You Want with His Love" peaked at number 48 on the same chart.

Chart performance

References

1995 singles
David Ball (country singer) songs
Song recordings produced by Blake Chancey
Warner Records singles
1994 songs
Songs written by David Ball (country singer)